Estadio Alfonso Lastras is a multi-use unfinished stadium in San Luis Potosí, Mexico.  It is currently used mostly for football matches, and also music concerts. It used to be the home stadium of San Luis F.C. but after it dissolved, Atlético San Luis is the current team that play in Alfonso Lastras. The stadium holds 25,709 people and was built in 2002. It is named after the late Alfonso Lastras Ramírez, who was co-founder of an early football club called Cachorros de San Luis.

As of 2017, the stadium was owned by Jacobo Payan Latuff and Atletico de Madrid.

The stadium hosted a 2018 World Cup qualifying match against Trinidad and Tobago.

References

Alfonso Lastras
San Luis F.C.
Sports venues in San Luis Potosí
Atlético San Luis